The  was a commission belonging to Japan′s Ministry of Land, Infrastructure and Transport. Commission members are appointed by the transport minister to research causes of aircraft and railway accidents and to suggest improvements to prevent similar accidents in future. It was housed in the 2nd Building of the Central Common Government Office at 2-1-2 Kasumigasaeki in Chiyoda, Tokyo.

It was founded on October 1, 2001, replacing the Aircraft Accident Investigation Commission. After a train accident occurred on the Tokyo Metro Hibiya Line on March 8, 2000 the former AAIC was restructured to ARAIC to also deal with railway accidents.

The Japan Transport Safety Board began on October 1, 2008 as a merger between the Japan Marine Accident Inquiry Agency (JMAIA) and the ARAIC.

Investigations
 2001 Japan Airlines mid-air incident
 China Airlines Flight 120

See also

 Japan Civil Aviation Bureau

References

External links
AIRAIC in English (Archive)
ARAIC in Japanese (Archive)

Transport disasters in Japan
Ministry of Land, Infrastructure, Transport and Tourism
Rail accident investigators
Organizations investigating aviation accidents and incidents
2001 establishments in Japan
Organizations established in 2001
Organizations disestablished in 2008
Aviation organizations based in Japan